The Barons' Letter of 1301 was written by seven English earls and 96 English barons to Pope Boniface VIII as a repudiation of his claim of feudal overlordship of Scotland (expressed in the Bull Scimus Fili), and as a defence of the rights of King Edward I of England as overlord of Scotland. It was, however, never sent. The letter survives in two copies, known as A and B, both held in the National Archives at Kew under the reference E 26. Historically they were held amongst the documents in the Exchequer, Treasury of the Receipt department.

Creation
The occasion of the letter was a meeting of the Parliament of England held at Lincoln. It is addressed to the Pope, referred to as "most Holy Father", and dated from Lincoln on 12 February 1300. The letter explains in its text 

The seals of the signatories to the letter survive in excellent condition. Although they are now detached from the document, they form the earliest contemporary group of true coats of arms, the rules of heraldry having only been established at around the start of the 13th century, and were stated for that reason by Lord Howard de Walden to be of very great value to students of heraldry. Many of the armorials also appear in the near contemporary Falkirk Roll of Arms made before the Battle of Falkirk in 1298 and in the near contemporaneous stained glass shields in Dorchester Abbey, Oxfordshire. Many are also Blazoned in verse in the Roll of Caerlaverock of 1300.

Purpose
The letter was written by English barons (mainly feudal barons and a few barons by writ) as a repudiation to the pope of his claim to feudal overlordship of Scotland, which he had expressed in a papal bull dated 27 June 1299 at Agnani. The bull was addressed to King Edward I of England and it was delivered by Robert Winchelsey, Archbishop of Canterbury at Sweetheart Abbey in Galloway, Scotland, on 26th or 27 August 1300. The bull is preserved in the National Archives at Kew under reference SC 7/6/10.

The king sought the advice of William of Sardinia, a former Dean of Arches to the Archbishop, as to what his response should be, and was presented with various options set out in a letter preserved in the National Archives (C/47/31/15). The Papal bull had been delivered to the king at a sensitive moment, just after the hard-won English victory at the Siege of Caerlaverock Castle over the Scots. Following their defeat at the Battle of Falkirk in 1298 the Scots had appealed to the pope for his protection, yet the English had fought to subject their northern neighbour and were not about to release it from under their control, perhaps only to rise up again against them.

The French were the real movers of the pope's claim, having suggested the move to him as a means to effect protection of the Scots, then their allies under the Auld Alliance, and were themselves allied with the Scots against the English. An English attack on a kingdom the feudal overlord of which was the pope would be virtually unthinkable in political and religious terms. There was thus no question of the English even considering the pope's claim, and the tone of the barons' reply to him is one of anger and open defiance, devoid of almost any of the diplomatic niceties with which the papal bull was replete.

In the event, the Barons' Letter was never sent to the pope, as events changed rapidly to such an extent that it appeared superfluous. A letter to the same effect from the king had however been sent to the pope; it is now held in the Vatican Archives with a copy in the National Archives at Kew under reference C 54/118. It was stored away within the archives of the Exchequer, where the two copies of it remained for several centuries until transferred to Public Record Office under the custody of the Master of the Rolls before 1903 and more recently transferred to the National Archives at Kew.

Seals
The letter was composed and sealed at the parliament specially convened for the purpose of replying to the Pope's letter held at Lincoln between 13–20 January 1301. To it were summoned 9 earls and 80 barons, yet 7 earls and 96 barons are recorded in the letter itself as co-authors. Those barons who did not answer the summons sealed the letter later.

The seals appended by hempen cords to Exemplar B were "tricked" (i.e. reproduced by drawing) by Lancaster Herald  Nicholas Charles in 1611. He also made a transcript of Exemplar B., which clearly was then in a better state of preservation than today. Whilst his drawings provide much detail which is otherwise difficult to see in photographs of the seals themselves, some of his transcripts of the legends are inaccurate.

In 1903 Lord Howard de Walden published Charles' drawings and a facsimile of his transcript, and also two sets of photographic images of the seals from Exemplar A; firstly of all the surviving individual cords of seals in colour (showing one face only of each seal), and secondly black and white images of each constituent seal on the cord, obverse and reverse (where existing). The number of surviving seals (series unspecified) is given as 95 by the National Archives catalogue entry, and as 72 (7 earls and 65 barons) by Brian Timms. Photographic images were published by Brian Timms on his heraldry website.

List of the barons who sealed the letter

|| 
|-
|4||Humfridus de Bohun Comes Hereford & Essex & Constabulari Anglie (Humfrey de Bohun Earl of Hereford & Essex & Constable of England); Humphrey de Bohun, 4th Earl of Hereford; S(IGILLUM) H DE BOHUN COMITIS HEREFORD ET CONSTABULAR(II) ANGL(IAE) / S(IGILLUM) HUMFRIDI D3E BOHUN COMITIT HEREFORDIE ET ESSEXIE||align="center"|||
{| style="border: 1px solid darkgray;"
|-
|
|-
|
|}
||
|-
|5||Rogerus Bigo Comes Norff' & Marescallus Anglie (Roger Bigod Earl of Norfolk & Marshall of England); Roger Bigod, 5th Earl of Norfolk; SIGILLUM ROGERI BIGOD (seal of Roger Bigod)||align="center"|||
{| style="border: 1px solid darkgray;"
|-
|
|-
|
|}
|| 
|-
|6||Ricardus Comes Arundell (Richard Earl Arundel); Richard FitzAlan, Earl of Arundel; SIGILLUM RICARDI COMITIS DE ARUNDELL (seal of Richard Earl of Arundell)||align="center"|||
{| style="border: 1px solid darkgray;"
|-
|
|-
|
|}
|| 
|-
|7||Guido Comes Warrewik (Guy Earl Warwick); Guy de Beauchamp, 10th Earl of Warwick; S(IGILLUM) GWIDONIS DE BELLO CAMPO COM WARREWYK/ S GUIDONIS DE BELLOCAMPO COMITIS WARREWIK (seal of Guy de Beauchamp Earl of Warwick)||align="center"|||

||
|-
|8||Adomarus de Valencia D(omi)n(u)s de Moniniaco (Aylmer de Valence Lord of Moniniaco); Aymer de Valence, 2nd Earl of Pembroke; SIGILLUM ADOMARI DE VALENCE||align="center"|||
{| style="border: 1px solid darkgray;"
|-
|
|-
|
|}
|| 
|-
|9||Will(elmu)s D(omi)n(u)s de Leyborn (William Lord of Leyburn) – William (d. 1309), son of Roger de Leybourne (1215-1271), Governor of Carlisle; S(IGILLUM) WILLIELMI DE LEYBURN||align="center"|||
{| style="border: 1px solid darkgray;"
|-
|
|-
|
|}
|| 
|-
|10||Henricus de Lancastre Dominus de Munemue (Henry of Lancaster Lord of Monmouth); Henry, 3rd Earl of Lancaster||align="center"|||
{| style="border: 1px solid darkgray;"
|-
|
|-
|
|}
|| 
|-
|11||Will(elmu)s le Latimer D(omi)n(u)s de Corby (William le Latimer Lord of Corby); William Latimer, 1st Baron Latimer||align="center"|||
{| style="border: 1px solid darkgray;"
|-
|
|-
|
|}
|| 
|-
|12|| Edmundus de Hastingg Dns de Enchimeholmok (Edmund de Hastings, Lord of Enchimeholmok) – Edmund Hastings, 1st Baron Hastings (younger brother of (13) Johannes de Hastinges Dns de Bergaveny)||align="center"|||
|| 
|-
|13||Johannes de Hastinges Dns de Bergaveny (John de Hastings, Lord of Bergavenny) – John Hastings, 1st Baron Hastings (elder brother of (12) Edmundus de Hastingg Dns de Enchimeholmok)||align="center"|||
|| 
|-
|14||Edmundus de Motuomari Dns de Wiggemor (Edmund Mortimer, Lord of Wigmore) – Edmund Mortimer, 2nd Baron Mortimer; S(IGILLUM) EDMUNDI DE MORTUOMARI (seal of Edmund from "the dead sea")||align="center"|||
{| style="border: 1px solid darkgray;"
|-
|
|-
|
|}
||
|-
|15||Fulco filius Warini Dns de Whitington (Fulk, son of Warin, Lord of Whittington) – Fulk IV FitzWarin of Whittington, Shropshire; SIGILLUM FULCONIS FILLII WARINI (seal of Fulk son of Warin)||align="center"|||
{| style="border: 1px solid darkgray;"
|-
|
|-
|
|}
||
|-
|16||Henricus de Percy, Dns de Topclive (Henry de Percy, Lord of Topcliffe) – Henry Percy, 1st Baron Percy; SIGILLUM HENRICI DE PERCY /SIGILLUM HENRICI DE PERCI ||align="center"|||

||
|-
|17||Theobaldus de Verdon, Dominus de Webbele (Theobald de Verdon, Lord of Weobley); Theobald de Verdon, 1st Baron Verdon||align="center"|||align="center"|||align="center"|
|-
|18||Robertus filus Walteri, Dns de Wodeham (Robert son of Walter, Lord of Wodeham) – Robert FitzWalter, 1st Baron FitzWalter (1247-1326) of Woodham Walter and Little Dunmow, Essex||align="center"|||align="center"|||
|-
|19||Johes Dns de Sullee (John, Lord of Sudeley) – John Sudeley, 1st Baron Sudeley||align="center"|||align="center"|||align="center"|
|-
|20||Johannes de Sco Johanne, Dns de Hannak (John St John, Lord of Halnaker, Sussex)||align="center"|||
{| style="border: 1px solid darkgray;"
|-
|
|-
|
|}
|| 
|-
|21||Johes de Bello Campo, Dns de Hacche (John de Beauchamp, Lord of Hatch) – John Beauchamp, 1st Baron Beauchamp of Somerset||align="center"|||align="center"|||align="center"|
|-
|22||Johannis de Hudleston, Dns de Aneys (John de Hodleston, Lord of Aneys)||align="center"|||
{| style="border: 1px solid darkgray;"
|-
|
|-
|
|}
||
|-
|23||Willus de Breuhosa Dns de Gower (William de Braose, Lord of Gower) – William de Braose, 2nd Baron Braose||align="center"|||
{| style="border: 1px solid darkgray;"
|-
|
|-
|
|}
|| 
|-
|24||Johannes Botetourte, Dns de Mendesham (John Botetourt, Lord of Mendlesham, Suffolk) – John Botetourt, 1st Baron Botetourt||align="center"|||
{| style="border: 1px solid darkgray;"
|-
|
|-
|
|}
||
|-
|25||Reginaldus de Grey, Dns de Ruthyn (Reynold/Reginald de Grey, Lord of Ruthin) – Reynold Grey, 1st Baron Grey of Wilton||align="center"|||align="center"|||align="center"|
|-
|26||Johes de Moeles, Dns de Caudebury (John de Moels, Lord of Cadbury) – John Moels, 1st Baron Moels||align="center"|||align="center"|||align="center"|
|-
|27||Johes filius Reginaldi, Dns de Blenleveny (John son of Reginald, Lord of Blaenllynfi); S(IGILLUM) JOHANNIS FILII REGINALDI (seal of John son of Reginald)||align="center"|||
{| style="border: 1px solid darkgray;"
|-
|
|-
|
|}
||
|-
|28||Almericus de Sco Amando Dns de Widehaye (Almeric de Saint Amand, Lord of Widehaye) || ||
{| style="border: 1px solid darkgray;"
|-
|
|-
|
|}
 ||
|-
|29||Robertus filius Pagani, Dns Lammer (Robert son of Payne, Lord of Lammer); Robert FitzPayne; S(IGILLUM) ROBERTI FILII PAGANI (seal of Robert son of Payne) || ||
{| style="border: 1px solid darkgray;"
|-
|
|-
|
|}
 ||
|-
|30||Thomas Dns de Berkele (Thomas Lord Berkeley) – Thomas de Berkeley, 1st Baron Berkeley || ||
{| style="border: 1px solid darkgray;"
|-
|
|-
|
|}
 ||
|-
|31||Petrus Corbet, Dns de Cauz (Peter Corbet, Lord of Caus); Sigillum Petri Corbet; Seal of Peter Corbet || ||
{| style="border: 1px solid darkgray;"
|-
|
|-
|
|}
 ||
|-
|32||Henricus de Tyes, Dns de Chilton (Henry de Tyes, Lord of Chilton) || ||
{| style="border: 1px solid darkgray;"
|-
|
|-
|
|}
 ||
|-
|33||Robtus de Tatteshale, Dns de Bukeham (Robert de Tattershall, Lord of Buckenham) || ||
{| style="border: 1px solid darkgray;"
|-
|
|-
|
|}
 ||
|-
|34||Johannes Lovel, Dns de Dacking (John Lovell, Lord of Dacking) || ||
{| style="border: 1px solid darkgray;"
|-
|
|-
|
|}
 ||
|-
|35||Hugo de Vere, Dns Swainschaumpis (Hugh de Vere, Lord of Swanscombe) – Hugh de Vere, Baron Vere, son of Robert de Vere, 5th Earl of Oxford || ||
{| style="border: 1px solid darkgray;"
|-
|
|-
|
|}
 ||
|-
|36||Robtus la Warde, Dns de Alba Aula (Robert la Warde, Lord of Alba Aula) || ||
{| style="border: 1px solid darkgray;"
|-
|
|-
|
|}
 ||
|-
|37||Johannes le Estraunge, Dns de Cnokyn (John le Strange, Lord of Knockin) – John Strange, 1st Baron Strange of Knockin || ||
{| style="border: 1px solid darkgray;"
|-
|
|-
|
|}
 ||
|-
|38||Thomas de Multon, Dns de Egremont (Thomas de Multon, Lord of Egremont) – Thomas Multon, 1st Baron Multon of Egremont || ||
{| style="border: 1px solid darkgray;"
|-
|
|-
|
|}
 ||
|-
|39||Rogerus de Mortuo Mari, Dns de Penketlyn (Roger de Mortimer, Lord of Pengethly) || ||
{| style="border: 1px solid darkgray;"
|-
|
|-
|
|}
 ||
|-
|40||Robertus de Clifford, Castellanus de Appelby (Robert de Clifford, Lord of Appleby) – Robert Clifford, 1st Baron Clifford|| ||
{| style="border: 1px solid darkgray;"
|-
|
|-
|
|}
 ||
|-
|41|| Willus de Cantilopo, Dns de Ravensthorp (William de Cantelupe, Lord of Ravensthorpe) || ||
{| style="border: 1px solid darkgray;"
|-
|
|-
|
|}
 ||
|-
|42||Brianus filius Alani, Dns de Bedale (Brian son of Alan, Lord of Bedale) – Bryan FitzAlan, Lord FitzAlan || ||
{| style="border: 1px solid darkgray;"
|-
|
|-
|
|}
 ||
|-
|43||Nicus de Carru, Dns de Mulesford (Nicholas de Carew, Lord of Moulsford) – Nicholas Carew (died 1311) || ||
{| style="border: 1px solid darkgray;"
|-
|
|-
|
|}
 ||
|-
|44||Johes de Haveringes, Dns de Grafton (John de Havering, Lord of Grafton) || ||
{| style="border: 1px solid darkgray;"
|-
|
|-
|
|}
 ||
|-
|45||Walterus de Teye, Dns de Standgreve (Walter de Teye, Lord of Standgreve) || ||
{| style="border: 1px solid darkgray;"
|-
|
|-
|
|}
 ||
|-
|46||Walt(er)us de Bello Campo, D(omi)n(u)s de Alcestre ("Walter de Beauchamp, Lord of Alcester") – Walter de Beauchamp (d.1306) of Beauchamp's Court, Alcester in Warwickshire and of Powick in Worcestershire, Steward of the Household to King Edward I. Younger brother of William de Beauchamp, 9th Earl of Warwick. Signed the Letter with his nephew Guy de Beauchamp, 10th Earl of Warwick || ||
{| style="border: 1px solid darkgray;"
|-
|
|-
|
|}
 ||
|-
|47||Alanus la Zuche, Dns de Assheby (Alan la Zouche, Lord of Ashby) – Alan la Zouche, 1st Baron Zouche of Ashby || ||
{| style="border: 1px solid darkgray;"
|-
|
|-
|
|}
 ||
|-
|48||Eustachius, Dns de Hacche (Eustace, Lord of Hacche) || ||
{| style="border: 1px solid darkgray;"
|-
|
|-
|
|}
 ||
|-
|49||Wills Martyn, Dns de Camesio (William Martin, Lord of Kemeys) || ||
{| style="border: 1px solid darkgray;"
|-
|
|-
|
|}
 ||
|-
|50||Johannes, Dns de Segrave (John, Lord of Segrave) – John Segrave, 2nd Baron Segrave || ||
{| style="border: 1px solid darkgray;"
|-
|
|-
|
|}
 ||
|-
|51||Wills de Ferrariis, Dns de Groby (William de Ferrers, Lord of Groby) – William Ferrers, 1st Baron Ferrers of Groby || ||
{| style="border: 1px solid darkgray;"
|-
|
|-
|
|}
 ||
|-
|52||Robtus de Tonny, Dns de Castro Matill (Robert de Tony, Lord of Castle Matill) || ||
{| style="border: 1px solid darkgray;"
|-
|
|-
|
|}
 ||
|-
|53||Adam, Dns Welle (Adam, Lord of Well) || ||
{| style="border: 1px solid darkgray;"
|-
|
|-
|
|}
 ||
|-
|54||Gilbertus Pecche, Dns de Corby (Gilbert Peche, Lord of Corby) || ||
{| style="border: 1px solid darkgray;"
|-
|
|-
|
|}
 ||
|-
|55||Wills Paynell, Dns de Tracyngton (William Paynell, Lord of Tracyngton) || ||
{| style="border: 1px solid darkgray;"
|-
|
|-
|
|}
 ||
|-
|56||Simon, Dns de Monte Acuto (Simon, Lord Montagu) || ||
{| style="border: 1px solid darkgray;"
|-
|
|-
|
|}
 ||
|-
|57||Petrus de Malolacu, Dns de Musgreve (Peter de Mauley, Lord of Mulgrave) – Peter Mauley, 1st Baron Mauley || ||
{| style="border: 1px solid darkgray;"
|-
| 
|-
| 
|}
 ||
|-
|58||Ranulphus de Nevill, Dns de Raby (Ranulph de Nevill, Lord of Raby) – Ranulph Neville, 1st Baron Neville (1262–1331) || ||
{| style="border: 1px solid darkgray;"
|-
|
|-
|
|}
 ||
|-
|59||Radulphus, Dns de Grendon (Ralph, Lord of Grendon) – Ralph Grendon, 1st Baron Grendon || ||
{| style="border: 1px solid darkgray;"
|-
|
|-
|
|}
 ||
|-
|60||Johannes de Mohun, Dns de Dunsterre (John de Mohun, Lord of Dunster); John Mohun III (1269-1330) || ||
{| style="border: 1px solid darkgray;"
|-
|
|-
|
|}
 ||
|-
|61||Henricus de Pynkeny, Dns de Wedone (Henry de Pinkney, Lord of Wedone) || ||
{| style="border: 1px solid darkgray;"
|-
| 
|-
| 
|}
 ||
|-
|62||Mattheus filius Jonis, Dns de Stokenhame (Matthew son of John, Lord of Stokenhame); Matthew FitzJohn || ||
{| style="border: 1px solid darkgray;"
|-
|
|-
|
|}
 ||
|-
|63||Thomas, Dns de la Roche (Thomas, Lord of la Roche) || ||
{| style="border: 1px solid darkgray;"
|-
|
|-
|
|}
 ||
|-
|64||Thomas de Chaurces, Dns de Norton (Thomas de Chaworth, Lord of Norton) || ||
{| style="border: 1px solid darkgray;"
|-
|
|-
|
|}
 ||
|-
|65||Robtus de Scales, Dns de Neuseles (Robert de Scales, Lord of Newsells) – Robert Scales, 1st Baron Scales || ||
{| style="border: 1px solid darkgray;"
|-
|
|-
|
|}
 ||

|-
|66||Thomas de Furnivall, Dns de Shefeold (Thomas de Furnivall, Lord of Sheffield) || ||
{| style="border: 1px solid darkgray;"
|-
|
|-
|
|}
 ||
|-
|67||Bogo de Knovill, Dns de Albomonasterio (Bogo de Knovill, Lord of Albomonasterio) || ||
{| style="border: 1px solid darkgray;"
|-
|
|-
|
|}
 ||
|-
|68||Fulco le Estraunge, Dns de Corsham (Fulk le Strange, Lord of Corsham) || ||
{| style="border: 1px solid darkgray;"
|-
|
|-
|
|}
 ||
|-
|69||Hugo Bardolfe, Dns de Wirmegaye (Hugh Bardolf, Lord of Wormegay) – Hugh Bardolf, 1st Baron Bardolf || ||
{| style="border: 1px solid darkgray;"
|-
|
|-
|
|}
 ||
|-
|70||Ricardus Talebot, Dns de Eckleswell (Richard Talbot, Lord of Eccleswall) – father of Gilbert Talbot, 1st Baron Talbot (1276-1346) || ||
{| style="border: 1px solid darkgray;"
|-
|
|-
|
|}
 ||
|-
|71||Edmundus de Eyncourt, Dns de Thurgerton (Edmund Deincourt, Lord of Thurgarton) – Edmund Deincourt, 1st Baron Deincourt || ||
{| style="border: 1px solid darkgray;"
|-
|
|-
|
|}
 ||
|-
|72||Emundus, Baro Stafford (Edmund, Baron Stafford) – Edmund Stafford, 1st Baron Stafford (1272–1308) || ||
{| style="border: 1px solid darkgray;"
|-
|
|-
|
|}
 ||
|-
|73||Phus, Dns de Kyme (Philip, Lord of Kyme) || ||
{| style="border: 1px solid darkgray;"
|-
|
|-
|
|}
 ||
|-
|74||Jones Pynell, Dns de Otteleye (John Paynel, Lord of Otley) || ||
{| style="border: 1px solid darkgray;"
|-
|
|-
|
|}
 ||
|-
|75||Walterus, Dns de Huntercombe (Walter, Lord of Huntercombe) – Walter de Huntercombe || ||
{| style="border: 1px solid darkgray;"
|-
|
|-
|
|}
 ||
|-
|76||Wills Marescallus, Dns de Hengham (William Marshal, Lord of Hingham) || ||
{| style="border: 1px solid darkgray;"
|-
|
|-
|
|}
 ||
|-
|77||Robertus de Monte Alto, Dns de Harwardyn (Robert Montalt, Lord of Harwardyn) || ||
{| style="border: 1px solid darkgray;"
|-
|
|-
|
|}
 ||
|-
|78||Hugo Poyntz, Dns de Corimalet (Hugh Poyntz, Lord of Curry Mallet) || ||
{| style="border: 1px solid darkgray;"
|-
|
|-
|
|}
 ||
|-
|79||Henricus Tregoz, Dns de Garynges (Henry Tregoz, Lord of Goring) || ||
{| style="border: 1px solid darkgray;"
|-
|
|-
|
|}
 ||
|-
|80||Wills Touchet, Dns de Leuenhales (William Touchet, Lord of Lewenhales) – William Tuchet, 1st Baron Tuchet || ||
{| style="border: 1px solid darkgray;"
|-
|
|-
|
|}
 ||
|-
|81||Johannes, Dns de Kingeston (John, Lord of Kingeston) || ||
{| style="border: 1px solid darkgray;"
|-
|
|-
|
|}
 ||
|-
|82||Robertus Hastang, Dns de la Desiree (Robert de Hastang, Lord of la Desiree) || ||
{| style="border: 1px solid darkgray;"
|-
|
|-
|
|}
 ||
|-
|83||Walterus, Dns de Faucomberge (Walter, Lord Fauconberg) || ||
{| style="border: 1px solid darkgray;"
|-
|
|-
|
|}
 ||
|-
|84||Rogerus le Estraunge, Dns de Cnokyn (Roger le Strange, Lord of Knockin) || ||
{| style="border: 1px solid darkgray;"
|-
|
|-
|
|}
 ||
|-
|85||Jones filius Marmeduci, Dns de Hordene (John son of Marmaduke, Lord of Holderness) – John FitzMarmaduke || ||
{| style="border: 1px solid darkgray;"
|-
|
|-
|
|}
 ||
|-
|86||Johannes le Breton, dns de Sporle (John le Breton, Lord of Sporle) || ||
{| style="border: 1px solid darkgray;"
|-
|
|-
|
|}
 ||
|-
|}

See also
Declaration of Arbroath, a declaration of Scottish independence, made in 1320. It is in the form of a letter submitted to Pope John XXII, dated 6 April 1320, intended to confirm Scotland's status as an independent, sovereign state
Scimus Fili

References

Text
See the full text on wikisource s:Barons' Letter, 1301 (English); :la:s:Baronum epistola, 1301 (Latin).

Sources
 Howard de Walden, Lord, Some Feudal Lords and their Seals 1301, published 1903 reprinted 1984. Latin transcript, English translation & photographic images of seals.
National Archives catalogue entry, Barons'Letter
Brian Timms heraldry website
Rymer, T, Foedera, (Ed.),  London, 1727, vol. II, p. 873, Latin transcript

Further reading
The Barons' Reply to the Pope, English Historical Society.
W. de Hemingburgh, Chronicon, Vol. II. pp. 209–213*Rymer's Foedera, I. 926-7.
Walsingham's Ypodigma, pp. 230–231.

External links

1301 in England
1300s in law
Constitutional laws of England
English manuscripts
Medieval charters and cartularies of England
Political charters
Pope Boniface VIII